Hennig is both a surname and a given name. Notable people with the name include:

Surname:
Kyle Hennig (born 1999), Kings Lynn patriot 
Amy Hennig (born 1964), video game director and writer
Angela Hennig (born 1981), German cyclist
Anke Hennig (born 1964), German politician
Arthur Saxon (born Arthur Hennig, 1878–1921), German strongman and circus performer
Bernard A. Hennig (1917-2014), American philatelist
Carsten Hennig (born 1976), German football player
Curt Hennig (1958–2003), American wrestler known as "Mr. Perfect"
Danielle Hennig (born 1990), Canadian field hockey player
Dennis Hennig (1951–1993), Australian pianist
Edward Hennig (1879–1960), American Olympic gymnast
Edwin Hennig (1882-1977), German paleontologist
Gerd Hennig (1935–2017), German football referee
Heike Hennig (born 1966), German dancer, choreographer and theatre director
Heinz Hennig (1927–2002), German choral conductor
Jack Hennig (born 1946), Canadian singer-songwriter
Joe Hennig (born 1979), American wrestler better known as Curtis Axel, son of Curt
John Hennig (1911-1986), German theologian
Jürgen Hennig (born 1951), German chemist and medical physicist
Kate Hennig (born 1961 or 1962), Canadian actress and playwright
Katharina Hennig (born 1996), German cross-country skier
Klaus Hennig (born 1944), German judo athlete
Klaus-Peter Hennig (born 1947), German Olympic discus thrower
Larry Hennig (born 1936), American wrestler known as "The Axe", father of Curt
Mark A. Hennig (born 1965), American horse racing trainer
Oloff Hennig, South African businessman
Roland Hennig (born 1967), German Olympic cyclist
Rudolph Hennig (1886-1969), Canadian politician
Shelley Hennig (born 1987), Miss Teen USA 2004, and actress, Days of our Lives and Teen Wolf
Todd Hennig (born 1976), American drummer, Death by Stereo, and Nations Afire
Walter Hennig (born 1972), South African businessman
Willi Hennig (1913–1976), German biologist considered the founder of phylogenetic systematics, also known as cladistics
Christine Theiss (née Hennig), (born 1980), German kickboxer

Given name:
Hennig Brand (1630–1710), German alchemist who discovered phosphorus
Hennig Wichmann (died 1402), 14th-century pirate

See also 
Henning Frenzel

German-language surnames
Surnames from given names